Accacoelium is a genus of flatworms belonging to the family Accacoeliidae.

The species of this genus are found in Europe and Northern America.

Species:

Accacoelium contortum 
Accacoelium pelagiae

References

Platyhelminthes